Lewistown station, also known as Burlington Northern Railroad Station at Lewistown and Lewiston Depot, is a historic train station located at Lewistown, Lewis County, Missouri. It was built in 1871 by the Quincy, Missouri, and Pacific Railroad, and is a one-story, gable roofed, frame building with wide overhanging eaves. It measures 24 feet, 6 inches, by 50 feet, 6 inches, and is sheathed in vertical board and batten siding.  It was moved to its present location in 1977 to house a community centre.

It was listed on the National Register of Historic Places in 1979 as the Quincy, Missouri, and Pacific Railroad Station.

References

Former Chicago, Burlington and Quincy Railroad stations
Railway stations on the National Register of Historic Places in Missouri
Railway stations in the United States opened in 1871
National Register of Historic Places in Lewis County, Missouri
1871 establishments in Missouri
Former railway stations in Missouri